Wilmer Allison and John Van Ryn successfully defended their title, defeating John Doeg and George Lott in the final, 6–3, 6–3, 6–2 to win the gentlemen's doubles tennis title at the 1930 Wimbledon Championship.

Seeds

  John Doeg /  George Lott (final)
  Wilmer Allison /  John Van Ryn (champions)
  Jacques Brugnon /  Henri Cochet (semifinals)
  Ian Collins /  Colin Gregory (semifinals)

Draw

Finals

Top half

Section 1

The nationality of BO Porter is unknown.

Section 2

Bottom half

Section 3

Section 4

References

External links

Men's Doubles
Wimbledon Championship by year – Men's doubles